Vlastiboř is a municipality and village in Tábor District in the South Bohemian Region of the Czech Republic. It has about 300 inhabitants.

Administrative parts

Villages of Svinky and Záluží are administrative parts of Vlastiboř.

Geography
It lies mostly in the Třeboň Basin, but it also extends to the Tábor Uplands on the north and east. The Bechyňský Stream flows through the municipality. There is a set of ponds fed by the stream, situated in the northern part of the municipal territory.

History
The first written mention of Vlastiboř is from 1354.

Sights
All the three villages in the municipality have well preserved buildings in the Folk Baroque style and are protected by law as two village monument reservations (Vlastiboř and Záluží) and one village monument zone (Svinky).

Notable people
František Kotlaba (1927–2020), botanist and mycologist

References

External links

Villages in Tábor District